The 1962–63 season was the 61st in the history of the Western Football League.

The champions for the seventh time in their history, and the second time in succession, were Bristol City Reserves. This season marked the last time that a reserve team won the Western League.

Final table
The league was increased from 20 to 22 clubs after two new clubs joined:

Andover
Exeter City Reserves, rejoining after leaving the league in 1961.

References

1962-63
5